Sarumotoria is a locality near Dispur, the capital of the Indian state of Assam.  It is located northeast of Guwahati-Shillong (G.S.) Road.

Dispur